Her Nameless Child is a 1915 British silent drama film directed by A. V. Bramble, Fred Groves and M. Gray Murray. It was based on a play by Madge Duckworth.

Cast
 A. V. Bramble - Lord Harry Woodville
 Fred Groves - Arthur Ford
 M. Gray Murray - Earl of Richborough
 Elisabeth Risdon - Phyllis / Alice Ford

References

External links

1915 films
British silent feature films
1910s English-language films
Films directed by Maurice Elvey
1915 romantic drama films
British romantic drama films
British black-and-white films
1910s British films
Silent romantic drama films